Fracchia contro Dracula (also known as Who Is Afraid Of Dracula? and Fracchia vs. Dracula) is a 1985 Italian horror comedy film directed by Neri Parenti.

Plot summary 
Giandomenico Fracchia, Villaggio's "monstrously shy" character, is tasked to sell a piece of real estate in Transylvania. Otherwise, he will lose his job. The customer is the obtusely nagging and prickly accountant Arturo Filini, who suffers from heavy nearsightedness and does not realize that the manor he is interested in is actually Count Dracula's castle. 

Once on the spot, Fracchia is terrified at the going-ons while Filini, in true Mister Magoo-style, dismisses them as 'tricks' to dissuade him from the estate deal. Meanwhile, a young and attractive vampire hunter (Isabella Ferrari) arrives. She is determined to avenge her brother's death, who perished trying to rid the world of Dracula and his cohorts. The events turn even more farcical when Dracula's sister confesses her love for Fracchia to try to avoid being engaged to the Frankenstein Monster. In the end an ash-tipped umbrella seems to solve the situation, but...was it all for real or just a horror-film fueled nightmare?

Cast

Release
Fraccia contro Dracula was distributed theatrically in Italy by Titanus on December 19, 1986. The film grossed a total of 818,235,000 Italian lire. Film historian and critic Roberto Curti stated that the film was a commercial disappointment being released at a fruitful time of the year and only becoming the 60th highest grossing film in Italy of that year.

References

Sources

External links

1985 films
Italian comedy films
1980s comedy horror films
Dracula films
Italian vampire films
Films directed by Neri Parenti
Films scored by Bruno Zambrini
Films set in castles
Films shot in Aosta Valley
Films set in Rome
Films set in Transylvania
Vampire comedy films
1985 comedy films
1980s Italian films